This was the first edition of the tournament.

Francisco Cerúndolo won the title after defeating Pedro Sousa 4–6, 6–3, 7–6(7–4) in the final.

Seeds

Draw

Finals

Top half

Bottom half

References

External links
Main draw
Qualifying draw

Split Open - Singles
Split Open